Aissata Maiga (born 21 March 1992) is a Malian basketball player for AS Police and the Malian national team.

With the Mali women's basketball team, she was a finalist in the 2009 African Championship, 15th in the 2010 World Championship, third in the 2011 African Championship, fifth in the 2013 African Championship and the 2015 African Championship. She won the 2015 All-African Games. 

She participated at the 2017 Women's Afrobasket.

References

External links

1992 births
Living people
Malian women's basketball players
Sportspeople from Bamako
Point guards
Malian expatriate sportspeople in the United States
Malian expatriate basketball people in the United States
Troy Trojans athletes
Competitors at the 2019 African Games
African Games silver medalists for Mali
African Games medalists in basketball
21st-century Malian people